The Perry River (in French: rivière Perry) is a tributary of the Palmer River whose current flows successively into the Bécancour River, then on the south shore of the St. Lawrence River. The Perry River flows in the municipalities of Thetford Mines (Pontbriand sector) and Saint-Pierre-de-Broughton, in the Les Appalaches Regional County Municipality (MRC), in the administrative region of Chaudière-Appalaches, in Quebec, in Canada.

Geography 

The main neighboring watersheds of the Perry River are:
 north side: Palmer River;
 east side: Palmer River, Rivière du Cinq;
 south side: Palmer River, Prévost-Gilbert River, Bécancour River;
 west side: Osgood River.

The Perry river has its source in the third rang, north of the village of Pontbriand in Thetford Mines and on the northern slope of the "Montagne du Trois", the summit of which is accessible by the chemin des turns.

From its head area, the Perry River flows over  divided into the following segments:
  eastward, up to the confluence of a stream running parallel (south side) to the main course of the river;
  north, up to the fourth range road bridge;
  north, crossing the 3th rang road, crossing the municipal limit of Saint-Pierre-de-Broughton, up to the confluence the Connolly Stream;
  north-west, passing east of the hamlet "Custeau", to the 15th rang road bridge;
  northeasterly, to its mouth.

The Perry River drains on the west bank of the Palmer River in the municipality of Saint-Pierre-de-Broughton.

Toponymy 
The term "Perry" is a family surname of English origin.

The toponym "rivière Perry" was made official on {October 6, 1983 at the Commission de toponymie du Québec.

See also 
 List of rivers of Quebec

References 

Rivers of Chaudière-Appalaches
Les Appalaches Regional County Municipality